Dogster is a bimonthly magazine and website for dog lovers. Its sister publication is Catster, a bimonthly magazine and website for cat lovers. Dogster magazine (formerly Dog Fancy) has been continuously published since 1970, celebrating 50 years in 2020.

Dogster began as a community site and in 2005 won a Webby Award in the category for best community site. 

It was acquired by SAY Media in 2011. In July 2014, Dogster and Catster were sold to Lumina Media. In 2015, Lumina Media combined its two large cat and dog brands — Dog Fancy magazine and Dogster.com and Cat Fancy magazine and Catster.com — under the brand names of Catster and Dogster. The Dogster and Catster brands were sold to Belvoir Media Group in April 2017. 

Belvoir Media Group is based in Norwalk, Connecticut, and publishes a variety of special interest magazines, newsletters and websites. In addition to Dogster and Catster, Belvoir Media Group's pet publications include Whole Dog Journal, Cornell University DogWatch, Tufts University Your Dog, Cornell University CatWatch and Tufts University Catnip.

References

External links

Belvoir Media Group

Bimonthly magazines published in the United States
American social networking websites
Internet properties established in 2004
Dog organizations
Internet forums